Goslin is the name of:

Former name of the city of Murowana Goślina  
Bob Goslin (born 1928), New Zealand boxer
Charles Goslin (1932-2007), American graphic designer and professor
Goose Goslin (1900-1971), American  baseball player
Gregg Goslin, American politician
Harry Goslin (1909-1943), English footballer
Joscelin (Bishop of Paris) (died 886), Frankish bishop also known as Goslin